Italian Argentines (or tanos in Rioplatense Spanish) are Italian-born people (born in Argentina or Italy) or non-Italian citizens of Italian descent residing in Argentina. Italian is the largest single ethnic origin of modern Argentines, surpassing even the descendants of Spanish immigrants.

Italian immigration to Argentina was the largest and most important migratory movement that the current Argentine Republic has historically received, surpassing that of the Spanish conquerors and the descendants of that population who settled in today's Argentine territory before independence.

In 2011, it was estimated that at least 25 million Argentines (62.5% of the country's population) have some degree of Italian ancestry. Argentina has the second-largest community of Italians outside of Italy, after Brazil. Contingents of Italian immigrants arrived in Argentina from all regions of Italy, mainly from Northern Italy in the 19th century and mostly from Southern Italy in the 20th century. Italians began arriving in Argentina in large numbers from 1857 to 1940, totaling 44.9% of the entire postcolonial immigrant population, more than from any other country (including Spain, at 31.5%). In 1996, the population of Argentines of partial or full Italian descent numbered 15.8 million when Argentina's population was approximately 34.5 million, meaning they represented 45.5% of the population.

Italian settlements in Argentina, along with Spanish settlements, formed the backbone of modern Argentine society. Argentine culture has significant connections with Italian culture in terms of language, customs, and traditions. Argentina is also a strongly Italophilic country as cuisine, fashion, customs, traditions, and lifestyle have been sharply influenced by Italian immigration.

History

During the Spanish conquest of what would be present-day Argentine territory, an Italian Leonardo Gribeo, from the region of Sardinia, accompanied Pedro de Mendoza to the place where Buenos Aires would be founded. From Cagliari to Spain, to Río de la Plata, then to Buenos Aires, he brought an image of Saint Mary of Good Air, to which the "miracle" of having reached a good place was attributed, giving the founded city its name in Spanish: Buenos Aires ( "good airs").

The presence of Italians in the Río de la Plata Basin predates the birth of Argentina. Small groups of Italians began to emigrate to the present-day Argentine territory already in the second half of the 17th century.

There were already Italians in Buenos Aires during the May Revolution, which started the Argentine War of Independence. In particular, Manuel Belgrano, Manuel Alberti and Juan José Castelli, all three of Italian descent, were part of the May Revolution and the Primera Junta. The Italian community had already grown to such an extent that in 1836 the Kingdom of Piedmont-Sardinia sent an ambassador, Baron Picolet d'Hermilion.

However, the stream of Italian immigration to Argentina became a mass phenomenon only from 1880 to 1920, during the Great European immigration wave to Argentina. Over that time period, about two million Italians settled in Argentina, with one million coming from 1900 to 1914. A small number of Italo-Albanians also emigrated to Argentina from Southern Italy.

In 1887, Italians accounted for 60.4% of all immigration to Argentina, then there was a decrease as the percentage of Spanish immigration increased. The effect of Italian immigration to Argentina was important for the constitution of Argentine society. In Argentina there are influences of Italian culture that are still evident in modern times. Outside of Italy, Argentina is the country with the highest percentage of Italians, and the one with the greatest examples of Italian culture.

In 1914, Buenos Aires alone had more than 300,000 Italian-born inhabitants, representing 25% of the total population. 
The Italian immigrants were primarily male, aged between 14 and 50 and more than 50% literate; in terms of occupations, 78.7% in the active population were agricultural workers or unskilled laborers, 10.7% artisans, and only 3.7% worked in commerce or as professionals.

The outbreak of World War I and the rise of fascism in Italy caused a rapid fall in immigration to Argentina, with a slight revival in 1923 to 1927 but eventually stopped during the Great Depression and World War II.

After the end of the war, from 1946 to 1957, another massive wave of Italians moved to Argentina, this time numbering about 380,000. A small number of Istrian Italians and Dalmatian Italians emigrated to Argentina during the Istrian-Dalmatian exodus, leaving their homelands, which were lost to Italy and annexed to Yugoslavia after the Treaty of Peace with Italy, 1947.

In the late 1960s, the Italian economy experienced a period of growth and recovery, removing one of the primary incentives for emigration. As of 2016, 527,570 Italian citizens still lived in Argentina.

In 2011, it was estimated that at least 25 million Argentines (62.5% of the country's population) have some degree of Italian ancestry. Argentina has the second-largest community of Italians outside of Italy, after Brazil. Jorge Luis Borges stated that "the Argentine is an Italian who speaks Spanish", while the Spanish philosopher Julián Marías stated that Argentina could be "the only Italian-Spanish republic on the planet". The Italian economist Marcello De Cecco said: "Italians, as we know, are a people of emigrants. For many centuries they have spread to the four corners of the world. However, they constitute the majority of the population in only two countries: Italy and Argentina."

There are second and third generation Italian Argentines who hold dual citizenship, recognized by both countries. This is because Argentina uses the ius soli principle, which grants nationality to those born in the country, while Italy uses the ius sanguinis principle, which grants citizenship to the children of Italians.

Italians abroad have elected deputies and senators in the Italian Parliament since 2006, when, after a constitutional reform, 12 seats in Chamber of Deputies and six seats in the Senate were assigned to the Italian diaspora. Argentina belongs to the constituency of South America, which corresponds to three deputies and two senators.

Reasons for Italian immigration to Argentina

Between the end of the 19th and the beginning of the 20th century, emigration from Italy was largely due to conditions of widespread poverty, high demographic pressure and heavy taxation, while Argentina was a country with a strong need for immigrants. The welcoming commitment, enshrined in the constitution of 1853, found its reasons in a de facto underpopulated country. The Argentine population, a country whose land area is nine times larger than that of Italy, was only 1.1 million in 1850) and was eager to populate the large regions conquered in the recent War of the Triple Alliance and with the so-called Conquest of the Desert (Patagonia).

Furthermore, a law passed by the Argentine government in 1876 offered the possibility of free land assignments or those payable in installments at very low prices, while in 1882 the government decided to grant 25 hectares of land free of charge to all families. In particular, article 25 of the current Argentine constitution states that:

Characteristics of Italian immigration to Argentina

Overview

Areas of origin

Italian immigrants arrived in Argentina from all regions of Italy, mainly from Northern Italy in the 19th century, and mostly from Southern Italy in the 20th century. Most of the Italians who initially moved to Argentina were farmers from the north, originating from regions such as Piedmont, Liguria, Veneto, Friuli-Venezia Giulia and Lombardy. Due to the nascent industrialization of Northern Italy in the 20th century, immigration patterns shifted to rural Southern Italy, especially Campania, Calabria and Sicily. Immigrants from northern Italy settled mainly in rural areas, while those from the south preferred large cities.

Of the 2,386,181 Italians who arrived in Argentina between 1876 and 1930, 47% (1,116,369) came from Southern Italy, 41% (988,235) from Northern Italy and 12% from Central Italy (281,577). The Italian regions from which most of the immigrants came were Piedmont (in the north) and Calabria (in the south). Calabrian immigrants have always arrived in large numbers and their migration has not changed much over time. Immigrants from Sicily began to arrive in large numbers from 1895 to the early 1900s, and by 1914, one in six immigrants were Sicilian.

In the 1950s, more than 65% of Italian immigrants came from the south, with 30% from Calabria, 15% from Campania and 12% from Sicily. Of the remaining 35%, 21% came from central-southern regions, in particular Abruzzo and Molise (in this case 14%), while 13% came from the north, mainly from Veneto and Friuli-Venezia Giulia.

Of the immigrants who arrived between 1876 and 1915, 16.9% were from Piedmont, 13.2% from Calabria, 11.1% from Sicily, 10.4% from Lombardy, 8.2% from Marche, 7.5% from Campania, 7.2% from Veneto and 3.2% from Abruzzo and Molise, which then constituted a single region. Tuscany, Umbria, Lazio and Emilia-Romagna, in central Italy, were the regions that contributed the least to immigration to Argentina.

In Argentine slang, tano (from Napulitano, "Neapolitan") is still used for all people of Italian descent although it originally meant inhabitants of the former independent state the Kingdom of Naples. The assumption that emigration from cities was negligible has an important exception. Naples went from being the capital of its own kingdom in 1860 to being just another large city in Italy. The loss of bureaucratic jobs and the subsequently declining financial situation led to high unemployment. This caused a massive departure from Naples and southern Italy to Argentina.

According to a 1990 study, the high proportion of returnees can show a positive or negative correlation between regions of origin and of destination. Southern Italians indicate a more permanent settlement. Argentine society's Italian component is the result of 
Southern rather than Northern influences.

Religion 
Italian Argentines are predominantly Catholic Christians of the Latin rite. A group of Italian-Albanians, belonging to the Italo-Albanian Catholic Church observing the Byzantine rite, are present in Luis Guillón, in the Esteban Echeverría Partido in the Buenos Aires Province.

Settlement areas 

Most of the Italian immigrant community settled in the Buenos Aires Province, especially in the city of Buenos Aires, as well as in the provinces of Santa Fe, Entre Ríos, Córdoba, La Pampa, Tucumán, Santiago del Estero and Corrientes.

For example, in Rosario, Santa Fe, the descendants of Italians are almost 65% of the total of the city. Italian immigration to Argentina was markedly urban, with the exception of the province of Santa Fe, where agricultural colonies predominated.

In 1895, 181,361 of the 663,864 inhabitants of the city of Buenos Aires were Italians. The main settlement was the La Boca district of Buenos Aires, where Italians represented 80% of the merchants and 70% of the employees. At the same time there were 13 Italian-language newspapers.

In 1914, Buenos Aires had more than 300,000 inhabitants born in Italy, which represented 25% of the total population of the capital and 60% of the Italian immigration in all of Argentina. There, the Italian community was integrated into Buenos Aires society through institutions, schools, churches, newspapers and political groups.

In La Plata at the end of the 19th century there were almost 4,600 Italian emigrants in a city of just 10,000 inhabitants. Immigrants from northern Italy settled in highly populated regions of the country such as the provinces of Santa Fe, Córdoba and Mendoza, where they found better job opportunities.

The capital of Chaco Province, Resistencia, was the destination of many Italians after 1878. Patagonia was a minor destination. However, the city of Ushuaia, capital of the Tierra del Fuego Province, received a substantial influx of Italians between 1948 and 1949.

Subsidized immigration 
Subsidized immigration has never been relevant, although agricultural colonies have been established in central and northeastern Argentina. The first was in the Corrientes Province in 1853, establishing the way for companies to advance the travel expenses of immigrants and the expenses necessary to start the business in the allotted lots. According to the 1895 census, out of a total of 407,503 subsistence peasants, more than a quarter were of foreign nationality, and of these 62,975 were Italians, of which the largest community was from Calabria.

Italian-born in Argentina in 2010

The 2010 Argentine census recorded 147,499 people born in Italy. According to the 2010 Argentine census, out of a total of 147,499 people born in Italy, 65,021 were men and 82,478 were women. Out of the total number of men, 966 were between 0 and 14 years old, 20,226 between 15 and 64 years old and 43,829 were over 65 years old. Of the total number of women, 1,011 were between 0 and 14 years of age, 21,597 between 15 and 64 years of age and 59,870 were over 65 years of age. The following table shows the distribution in the 23 provinces and in the Autonomous City of Buenos Aires:

Discrimination

Compared to the experience of Italians in other parts of the world, such as in the United States, Italian Argentines did not suffer from anti-Catholic or racist sentiments. Catholic societies in Argentina welcomed new settlers of the same faith, who could help shape the country. Italian Argentines have integrated better into the general society than German Argentines also due to the similarity between the Spanish and Italian languages.

Despite this, there were extreme cases in which Italian Argentines suffered xenophobia, such as in the 1931 trial against anarchist Severino Di Giovanni. Di Giovanni's trial aroused some anti-Italian sentiments, motivated above all by the fear of attacks on the Argentine state by Italian anarchists.​ Between the end of the 19th century and the beginning of the 20th century, the bourgeoisie of Spanish origin initially looked at the large number of Italians with an evil eye, fearing for the social ascent of the following generations, thus asking for the intervention of Argentine national culture. The main concern was aimed at anarchists and socialists, for whom repressive laws were passed in 1902 and 1910.

Culture

Argentine culture, in its Italian component, is the result of influences from southern Italy rather than from the north. According to the anthropologist Stefania Pedrini of the University of Rome La Sapienza, this cultural influence is due to the fact that "at the end of the 19th century Argentina was a new nation, which did not have a defined identity, and in which the grandeur European immigration has influenced the construction of a national being, through a policy of very strong cultural syncretism." At the same time there are Italian traditions still maintained in Argentina but forgotten or little remembered in Italy. Many of these Italians who brought their culture came from the lower middle classes.

Language

According to Ethnologue, Argentina has more than 1,500,000 Italian speakers, making it the third most spoken language in the nation (after Spanish and English). In spite of the large Italian immigration, the Italian language never truly took hold in Argentina, partly because at the time of mass immigration, almost all Italians spoke their native regional languages rather than what is now standard Italian, precluding the expansion of the use of Italian as a primary language in Argentina. The similarity between Spanish and many of those languages also enabled the immigrants to acquire communicative competence in Spanish with relative ease, and thus to assimilate linguistically without much difficulty.

By 1840, Italian-language newspapers were already published in Buenos Aires, increasing in 1900. The main one was La Patria degli Italiani ("The homeland of the Italians"), which in turn was the third most important in Argentina, with a circulation of 14,000 copies. On 22 February 1917, the government of Hipólito Yrigoyen, with Decree n. 6925, made the teaching of the Italian language compulsory in the 4th and 5th grades of secondary school in national schools.

Italian immigration from the second half of the 19th century to the beginning of the 20th century made a lasting and significant impact on the intonation of Argentina's vernacular Spanish. Preliminary research has shown that Rioplatense Spanish, particularly the speech of the city of Buenos Aires, has intonation patterns that resemble those of Italian dialects (especially the ones whose substratum is the Neapolitan language) and differ markedly from the patterns of other forms of Spanish. That correlates well with immigration patterns in Argentina, particularly Buenos Aires, which had huge numbers of Italian settlers since the 19th century. According to a study conducted by the National Scientific and Technical Research Council of Argentina, and published in Bilingualism: Language and Cognition (ISSN 1366–7289), the researchers note that this is a relatively recent phenomenon, starting in the early 20th century with the main wave of Southern Italian immigration. Until then, the porteño accent was more similar to that of Spain, particularly Andalusia.

Lunfardo is a slang born and developed in the city of Buenos Aires and its suburbs, which has spread to other nearby cities such as Rosario (in the Santa Fe Province) and Montevideo, Uruguay. The word comes from Lombard, a language spoken mainly in Lombardy (a region located in northern Italy). The sounds of the lunfardo feeds mainly from the languages of Italy, especially the northern ones, because in Buenos Aires the Italian colony is very extensive and has left onomasiology and terminology a vast lexical heritage. Additionally, lunfardo has taken its own words, expressions, or ways of speaking (borrowings) from various languages ​​such as French, Portuguese, English; other words arrived from the pampa by means of the gauchos; and a few came from Argentina's native population. Lunfardo words are inserted in the normal flow of Rioplatense Spanish sentences. Thus, a Spanish-speaking Mexican reading tango lyrics needs only the translation of a discrete set of words, not a grammar guide. Most tango lyrics use lunfardo sparsely, but some songs (such as  El Ciruja, or most lyrics by Celedonio Flores) employ lunfardo heavily. Here are some examples:

 Parlar – To speak (cfr. Italian parlare, Neapolitan parlà - to speak)
 Manyar – To know / to eat (cfr. Italian mangiare, Sicilian manciari - to eat)
 Mina – Female (cfr. Italian femmina ("female"), Sicilian fimmina ("woman"))
 Laburar – To work (cfr. Italian lavorare, Venetian laorar - to work)
 Fiaca – laziness (cfr. Italian fiacco, Piedmontese fiach - exhausted)
 Chapar – To kiss / to grab (cfr. Piedmontese ciapé, Venetian ciapar - to grab)
 Buonyorno – Good morning (cfr. Italian  buongiorno – good morning)
 Pibe – Boy (cfr. old Italian pivo – boy, apprentice)
 Birra – Beer (cfr. Italian, Neapolitan birra – beer)
 Mufa – Unlucky person (cfr. Italian muffa, Piedmontese mofa – mold)

Between about 1880 and 1900, Argentina received a large number of peasants from the South of Italy, who arrived with little or no schooling in Spanish. As the immigrants strove to communicate with the local criollos, they produced a variable mixture of Spanish with Italian languages and dialects, specially Neapolitan. The pidgin language was given the derogatory name cocoliche by the locals. Since the children of the immigrants grew up speaking Spanish at school, work, and military service, Cocoliche remained confined mostly to the first generation immigrants and slowly fell out of use. The pidgin has been depicted humorously in literary works and in the Argentine sainete theater, such as by Dario Vittori.

Cuisine

Argentine cuisine has been strongly influenced by Italian cuisine; the typical Argentine diet is a variation of the Mediterranean diet.

Italian staple dishes like pizza and pasta are common. Pasta is extremely common, either simple unadorned pasta with butter or oil or accompanied by a tomato or bechamel based sauce. Other similarities are found in the presence of the bañacauda (bagna càuda).

Pizza (locally pronounced pisa or pitsa), for example, has been wholly subsumed and, in its Argentine form, more closely resembles Italian pizza al taglio but round instead of rectangular. Pizza is shared between two or more people, not the usual Italian personal pizza. Typical or exclusively Argentine pizzas include pizza canchera, pizza rellena (stuffed pizza), pizza por metro (pizza by the meter), and pizza a la parrilla (grilled pizza). While Argentine pizza derives from Neapolitan cuisine, the Argentine fugaza/fugazza comes from the focaccia xeneise (from Genoa), but its preparation is different from its Italian counterpart, and the addition of cheese to make the dish (fugaza con queso or fugazzeta) started in Argentina.

Fainá is a type of thin bread made with chickpea flour (adopted from northern Italy). The name comes from the Ligurian word for the Italian farinata. Pizzerias in Buenos Aires often offer fainá, which is eaten with pizza, a wedge of fainá on top of a wedge of pizza.

Pastas (pasta, always in the plural) still surpass pizzas in consumption levels. Among them are tallarines (fettuccine), ravioles (ravioli), ñoquis (gnocchi), lasañas (lasagna), and canelones (cannelloni). In Argentina there are also Italian restaurants specializing in pasta. In Argentina, pasta is generally cooked, served and eaten in the local way, called all'uso-nostro ("for our use" or "our way"), a phrase of Italian origin.

For example, pasta is often eaten with white bread ("French bread"). That can be explained by the low cost of bread and the fact that Argentine pastas tend to come with a large amount of tuco sauce (Italian sugo) and accompanied by estofado (Italian stufato). Less commonly, pastas are eaten with a dressing of pesto, a green sauce made with basil, or salsa blanca (béchamel sauce).

Sorrentinos are also a local dish with a misleading name (they do not come from Sorrento but were invented in the Rio de La Plata region). It is believed that sorrentinos are a local derivation of the Italian ravioli capresi, whose dough is instead elaborated with flour, water and olive oil, while the filling is made with caciotta cheese, flavoured with oregano. Most sources point to an Italian immigrant from Sorrento, Rosalía Persico or his son Cayetano Persico, who created this pasta while working in a famous trattoria of Mar del Plata, while other sources state that they originated in another restaurant in Mar del Plata called Sorrento. They look like big round ravioles stuffed with mozzarella, cottage cheese and basil in tomato sauce.

Polenta comes from Northern Italy and is very common throughout Argentina. Similar to polenta concia in Italy, it is eaten as a main dish, with sauce and melted cheese, or it may accompany a stew. Since a tonic property has been attributed to it, the expression tener polenta ("having polenta") is used colloquially as a synonym for having strength. At the beginning of the 20th century, both in Italy and in Argentina, the popular classes ate polenta accompanied by bird meat. Buseca, a Lombard dish made with tripe, beans, tomato puree, carrots and celery, is also popular in Argentina.

Milanesas are one of the most popular dishes in Argentina and have been described as "one of the quintessential Río de la Plata dishes". A common dish of this variety is the milanesa a la napolitana, an Argentine innovation despite its name, which comes from former Buenos Aires restaurant "Nápoli." They are the legacy of Italian immigrants, who introduced cotoletta alla milanese, a dish from Milan, in the late 19th century and early 20th century. During that time, Argentina experienced a huge European immigration wave, with most immigrants coming from Italy. Milanesas are so ubiquitous to Argentine culture that the country even has a "Day of the Milanesa", celebrated on 3 May.

Among the foods that Italian immigrants have reproduced in Argentina are also some cheeses. The reggianito was one of the first reproductions of Parmigiano Reggiano, the sardo, which unlike the Pecorino sardo is made with cow's milk, the romano, a reinterpretation of the Pecorino Romano and the provolone. Cremoso cheese derives instead from Italian cheeses with similar characteristics as Crescenza and is the most consumed cheese in Argentina.

Pasta frola is a typical Argentine recipe heavily influenced by Southern Italian cuisine, known as pasta frolla in Italy. Pasta frola consists of a buttery pastry base with a filling made of quince jam, sweet-potato jam or milk caramel (dulce de leche) and topped with thin strips of the same pastry, forming a squared pattern. It is an Argentine tradition to eat pastafrola with mate in the afternoon. The dish is also very popular in Paraguay and Uruguay. The traditional Italian recipe was not prepared with latticework, unlike in Argentina, but with a lid pierced with molds in the form of hearts or flowers.

Among the desserts is the pandulce, originating from the Genoese pandolce, which is popular for Christmas and New Year's holidays. The cantuccini, desserts of Tuscan gastronomy, are also made and eaten in Argentina. Other Italian desserts are also consumed in Argentina such as tiramisu, of Venetian origin, zabaione, crostata (known in Argentina as ricotta cake) and panna cotta.

Ice cream is a particularly popular Argentine dessert. Its creamy texture is caused by the large proportion of cream, and many flavors are available. Ice cream was again a legacy of the Italian diaspora. Among the liqueurs are chitronchelo (limoncello) and grapa (grappa). Italian alcoholic beverages such as gancia and fernet are widely consumed in Argentina.

The noquis del 29 ("gnocchi of 29") defines the widespread custom in some South American countries of eating a plate of gnocchi on the 29th of each month. The custom is widespread especially in the states of the Southern Cone such as Brazil, Argentina, Paraguay, Uruguay; these countries being recipients of a considerable Italian immigration between the end of the 19th century and the beginning of the 20th century. There is a ritual that accompanies lunch with gnocchi, namely putting money under the plate which symbolizes the desire for new gifts. It is also customary to leave a banknote or coin under the plate to attract luck and prosperity to the dinner.

The tradition of serving gnocchi on the 29th of each month stems from a legend based on the story of Saint Pantaleon, a young doctor from Nicomedia who, after converting to Christianity, made a pilgrimage through northern Italy. There Pantaleon practiced miraculous cures for which he was canonized. According to legend, on one occasion when he asked Venetian peasants for bread, they invited him to share their poor table. In gratitude, Pantaleon announced a year of excellent fishing and excellent harvests. That episode occurred on 29 July, and for this reason that day is remembered with a simple meal represented by gnocchi.

Italian Immigrant Day
The Argentine national law n. 24,561 established that Italian Immigrant Day be celebrated each year on 3 June as recognition of Italian immigrants and their contribution to Argentina. This date was chosen because it is the day of the birth of Manuel Belgrano, of Genoese origin. Belgrano was the politician and military leader who created the flag of Argentina. His father was Italian.

Architecture

The Italian architect Giovanni Chiogna, who emigrated to Argentina from Trento, was hired by the Italian-Argentine Electric Company (CIAE) to build more than 200 structures for power plants, substations and substations in various parts of Buenos Aires. Currently some buildings maintain their function, while others have been transformed. These buildings are characterized by having a Florentine neo-Renaissance style originating in northern Italy, where Chiogna came from, with buildings that are characterized by the presence of stone and exposed brick bases, round arched windows, medieval turrets and other decorative elements.

Popular culture
From the Apennines to the Andes is a short fictional story included by Edmondo de Amicis in his novel Heart, published in 1886. It tells the story of the long and complicated journey of a 13-year-old boy, Marco, from Genoa, Italy to Argentina, in search of his mother, who had immigrated there two years earlier.

Il Gaucho is a film made in 1965 by the Italian director Dino Risi. It was co-produced by Clemente Lococo, an Argentinian production company, and in Argentina it was released as Un italiano en la Argentina ("An Italian in Argentina"). It was shot in Argentina.

The songs of Ivano Fossati Italiani d'Argentina ("Italians from Argentina"), contained in the album Discanto, and Argentina by Francesco Guccini, present in the Guccini album, are dedicated to the feeling of distance of the emigrants from Italy.

Music
The Italian contribution to the music of Argentina has been extremely important for tango. Among the first and most important tangueros were immigrants and descendants of Italians. There are also numerous tango lyrics inspired by Italian immigrants and their lives.

Institutions

The typology of Italian associations in Argentina is varied and includes, among others, cultural institutions, sports centers, social organizations and war veteran organizations. The Italian Association of Mutuality and Education "Unione y Benevolenza" was created by 53 Italians on 18 July 1858, becoming the first Italian institution in South America. Already in 1866 Italian language lessons were held there. The Confederation of Italian Federations in Argentina dates back to 1912 and brings together all the federations of Italian-Argentine associations. The Dante Alighieri Society is the most important Italian institution for the formation of the Italian language and culture. It has 126 offices in Argentina, with Buenos Aires being its main office outside Italy.

There are also the Committees for Italians Abroad, bodies of the Italian state created by law with functions in every consular jurisdiction, and there are several in Argentina. They represent the Italian community before the Italian consular authorities and the Argentine authorities.

Education

Italian international schools in Argentina include:
 Scuola Italiana Cristoforo Colombo (Buenos Aires)
 Istituto Scolastico "Scuola Edmondo De Amicis" (Buenos Aires, Rosario)
 Scuola "Dante Alighieri" (Córdoba, Rosario)
 Istituto di Cultura Italica (La Plata)
 Associazione Scuole Italiane "XXI Aprile" (Mendoza)
 Centro Culturale Italiano Scuole Alessandro Manzoni (Olivos and Villa Adelina)

Italian press in Argentina
The Italian-language press in Argentina essentially consists of two publications:
 L'Eco d'Italia ("The Echo of Italy"), Italian-language Argentine weekly magazine aimed at the Italian community in South America.
 L'Italiano ("The Italian"), Italian-language Argentine daily newspaper.

Argentine oriundi

In football, Italian Argentine "oriundi" Luis Monti and Raimundo Orsi were finalists of the FIFA World Cup with Argentina national football team in the 1930 FIFA World Cup and then champions with Italy national football team in the 1934 FIFA World Cup.

Other examples of Italian Argentine oriundi in football are Omar Sívori, Humberto Maschio and Antonio Valentín Angelillo, the three stars of the Argentina national football team that won the 1957 South American Championship, who took Italian citizenship, which allowed them to later play for the Italy national football team.

In recent years, the most famous Italian Argentine oriundo in football has been Mauro Camoranesi, who acquired Italian citizenship through a great-grandfather who in 1873 emigrated from Potenza Picena, in the Marche region, to Argentina. This allowed him to be part of Italy national football team that won the 2006 FIFA World Cup.

Notable people

Anarchists
Severino Di Giovanni, antifascist

Architects
César Pelli, designed some of the world's tallest buildings and other major urban landmarks

Artists

Daniela Anahí Bessia, singer
Antonio Agri, violinist
Charly Alberti, musician 
Tito Alberti, drummer 
Juan d'Arienzo, tango musician
Alba Arnova, dancer 
Juan Carlos Baglietto, musician 
Gato Barbieri, musician 
Adrián Barilari, musician 
Marilina Bertoldi, musician 
Rodolfo Biagi, musician 
Raúl di Blasio, musician 
Zeta Bosio, musician 
José Antonio Bottiroli, classical musician 
José Bragato, composer 
Enrique Cadícamo, tango lyricist 
Carmen Risso de Cancellieri, dancer 
Alberto Caracciolo, tango musician 
Julio de Caro, tango composer 
Eleonora Cassano, dancer 
Cacho Castagna, singer
Cazzu, rapper 
Gustavo Cerati, singer-songwriter
Enrique Santos Discépolo, tango composer
Duki, rapper
Lali Espósito, singer-songwriter, actress, dancer, model and director
Walter Giardino, guitarist and songwriter
León Gieco, singer
Paulo Londra, singer
Luisana Lopilato, actress, singer, and model
Agustín Magaldi, tango and milonga singer
Homero Manzi, tango lyricist
Daniel Melingo, musician
Litto Nebbia, singer-songwriter
Nicki Nicole, rapper
Pappo, guitarist, singer and composer
Soledad Pastorutti, folk singer
Nathy Peluso, singer
Astor Piazzolla, tango composer and bandoneon player
Luis Alberto Spinetta, singer, guitarist, composer and poet
Tini, singer
Aníbal Troilo, tango musician
Trueno, rapper
Lito Vitale, musician

Business

Daniel Angelici, president of Boca Juniors
Poppy Bermúdez Pippa, entrepreneur
Diego Bossio, economist 
Alejandro Bulgheroni, entrepreneur 
Carlos Bulgheroni, entrepreneur 
Alejandro Burzaco, entrepreneur 
Eduardo Costantini, real estate developer
Enrique Mosconi, military engineer
Horacio Pagani, car designer
Torcuato di Tella, industrialist and philanthropist

Criminals
 Cayetano Santos Godino, serial killer
Leopoldo Galtieri, general and president of Argentina during the Falklands War
Orlando Ramón Agosti, member of the military junta led by Jorge Rafael Videla that ruled Argentina between 1976 and 1981 
Reynaldo Bignone, dictatorial president of Argentina between 1982 and 1983 
Antonio Domingo Bussi, general 
Osvaldo Cacciatore, brigadier, who served as Mayor of Buenos Aires in the National Reorganization Process

Entertainers

Daniela Anahí Bessia, celebrity TV presenter and actress, model, influencer, producer
Quirino Cristiani, director who created the world's first animated film
Paola Carosella, celebrity chef, TV presenter, and one of the judges of Masterchef Brasil (currently based on Sao Paulo, Brazil)
Gimena Accardi, actress
Graciela Alfano, actress and vedette
Alejandro Agresti, film producer (currently based on the Netherlands)
Ernesto Alterio, actor (currently based between his home country, Argentina and Spain)
Héctor Alterio, actor (currently based between his home country, Argentina and Spain)
Malena Alterio, actress (currently based in Spain)
Luis César Amadori, film director 
Mike Amigorena, actor 
Mariana Anghileri, actress
Norberto Aroldi, actor 
Catalina Artusi, actress 
Christian Bach Bottino, actress
Ángeles Balbiani, actress 
Mario Baroffio, actor 
Valentina Bassi, actress
Florencia Bertotti, actress
Valeria Bertuccelli, actress 
Thelma Biral, actress 
José Bódalo Zúffoli, actor 
Patricio Borghetti, actor 
Luis Brandoni, actor 
Alicia Bruzzo, actress 
Héctor Calcagno, actor 
Juan José Campanella, film director
Charlotte Caniggia, model and media personality 
Diego Capusotto, TV presenter 
Hugo del Carril, actor 
Antonio Carrizo, TV and radio presenter 
Evangelina Carrozzo, model 
Moria Casanova, actress
Catrano Catrani, film director 
Agustina Cherri, actress
Juan Chioran, actor 
Tulia Ciámpoli, actress
Ricardo Darín, actor
Lucas Demare, film director, screenwriter and film producer
Alejandro Fantino, TV host
Dolores Fonzi, TV, theatre and film actress
Tomás Fonzi, actor
Guillermo Francella, actor
Nicolás Francella, actor
Renata Fronzi, actress
Carlos Galettini, film director, film producer and screenwriter
Carlos Gandolfo, stage actor and director 
Darío Grandinetti, actor
Juan Pedro Lanzani, actor and singer
Valeria Mazza, supermodel and businesswoman
Tita Merello, actress
Andrés Muschietti, film director
Florencio Parravicini, actor
Diego Peretti, actor
Oriana Sabatini, model, actress and singer
Julián Serrano, YouTuber, actor, singer and television presenter
Leonardo Sbaraglia, actor
Marcelo Tinelli, TV host, media producer and businessman
Valentina Zenere, actress, model and singer

Inventors

Sinforoso Amoedo Canaveri, doctor 
 Domingo Liotta, inventor of first successful artificial heart

Jurists
Juan de Canaveris, notary

Law enforcement figures
Carlos Alfredo D'Amico, lawyer 
José María Campagnoli, prosecutor
Sebastián Casanello, judge 
Susana Ruiz Cerutti, lawyer and former Chancellor

Journalism
José Amalfitani, sports journalist
Eduardo P. Archetti, anthropologist
Eric Calcagno, sociologist

Military
Joseph Gregorio Belgrano, colonel 
Manuel Belgrano, member of Primera Junta regarded as the father of the Flag of Argentina 
Manuel Canaveris, lieutenant 
Ángel Canavery, lieutenant colonel

Painters and sculptors

Antonio Alice
Aquiles Badi 
Antonio Berni 
Erminio Blotta 
Emilio Caraffa 
Ricardo Carpani 
Juan Carlos Castagnino 
Tito Cittadini
Pío Collivadino
Lucio Fontana

Politicians

Mario Barletta, Radical Civic Union politician 
Manuel Belgrano ,member of the Primera Junta 
Fabio Biancalani, Justicialist Party politician 
Delia Bisutti, Solidarity and Equality politician 
Antonio Bonfatti, Socialist Party politician 
Ángel Borlenghi, Peronist politician 
Juan Atilio Bramuglia, Peronist politician 
Teodoro Bronzini, Socialist Party politician 
Jorge Busti, Justicialist Party politician 
Juan Manuel Cafferata, National Autonomist Party politician 
Antonio Cafiero, Justicialist Party politician
Héctor José Cámpora, President of Argentina
Héctor Canaveri, National Autonomist Party politician 
Pedro Canaveri, Radical Civic Union and former President of Argentine Football Association
Dante Caputo, President of the United Nations General Assembly  
Ramón J. Cárcano, National Autonomist Party 
Juan José Castelli, member of the Primera Junta 
Domingo Cavallo, Justicialist Party 
Renato Carlos Sersale di Cerisano, Argentine Ambassador to United Kingdom 
Alfredo Chiaradía, former Ambassador to the United States 
Hugo Cóccaro, Justicialist Party 
Arturo Colombi, Radical Civic Union 
Ricardo Colombi, Radical Civic Union 
Lucía Corpacci, Justicialist Party
Arturo Frondizi, President of Argentina
Arturo Umberto Illia, President of Argentina
Raúl Alberto Lastiri, President of Argentina
Eduardo Lonardi, President of Argentina
Mauricio Macri, President of Argentina
Gabriela Michetti, Vice President of Argentina
Javier Milei, Freedom Advances
Carlos Pellegrini, President of Argentina
Juan Perón, President of Argentina
Daniel Scioli, former governor of Buenos Aires Province
Guido di Tella, businessman, academic, and diplomat
Roberto Eduardo Viola, President of Argentina

Prelates

Manuel Alberti, priest and member of the Primera Junta in 1810
Enrique Angelelli, bishop 
Carlos Azpiroz Costa, friar 
Pope Francis, born as Jorge Mario Bergoglio to Italian immigrants from Piedmont
Rómulo Antonio Braschi, bishop 
Carlos Armando Bustos Crostelli, member of the Order of Friars Minor Capuchin 
Antonio Caggiano, Cardinal and Archbishop of Buenos Aires
Tomás Canavery, priest 
Leonardo Castellani, priest 
Santiago Copello, Cardinal and Archbishop of Buenos Aires
Antonio Quarracino, Cardinal and Archbishop of Buenos Aires

Scientists
Juan Bautista Ambrosetti, archaeologist 
Florentino Ameghino, paleontologist 
José Bonaparte, paleontologist 
Zulma Brandoni de Gasparini, paleontologist 
Constanza Ceruti, archaeologist
Primarosa Chieri, physician 
Mario Crocco, neurobiologist
René Favaloro, cardiac surgeon
José Ingenieros, physician, pharmacist, philosopher, and essayist

Sports

Roberto Abbondanzieri, footballer  
José Acasuso, tennis player 
José Acciari, footballer
Agustina Albertario, field hockey player 
Matías Alemanno, rugby union player 
Leonel Altobelli, footballer 
Gabriel Amato, footballer 
Víctor Hugo Amatti, footballer 
Horacio Accavallo, boxer
Antonio Angelillo, footballer
Cristian Ansaldi, footballer
Juan Antonini, footballer
Tomás Argento, field hockey player 
Franco Armani, footballer 
Leandro Armani, footballer 
Mariano Armentano, footballer 
Leandro Baccaro, field hockey player 
Tomás Badaloni, footballer
Facundo Bagnis, tennis player 
Horacio Raúl Baldessari, footballer 
Estefanía Banini, football player 
Mariano Barbosa, footballer 
Guillermo Barros Schelotto, footballer and manager
Gustavo Barros Schelotto, footballer and manager 
Alfio Basile, football coach 
Roberto Basílico, footballer 
Oscar Basso, footballer 
Pablo Bastianini, footballer 
Damián Batallini, footballer
Gabriel Batistuta, footballer
Sebastián Battaglia, footballer 
Cristian Battocchio, footballer 
Elias Bazzi, footballer 
Luciano Becchio, footballer 
Carlos Bechtholdt Bazzano, footballer 
Amelia Belotti, handball player 
Darío Benedetto, footballer
Eduardo Berizzo, footballer and coach 
Lucas Bernardi, footballer 
Attilio Bernasconi, footballer 
Sergio Berti, footballer 
Daniel Bertoni, footballer 
Lucas Besozzi, footballer
Juan Betinotti, footballer
Gonzalo Bettini, footballer
Claudio Biaggio, footballer 
Bruno Bianchi, footballer
Carlos Bianchi, footballer 
Valeria Bianchi, handball player 
Emanuel Biancucchi, footballer 
Maxi Biancucchi, footballer
Ludovico Bidoglio, footballer 
Marcelo Bielsa, football coach
Lucas Biglia, footballer 
Carlos Bilardo, football coach
Dan Biocchi, athlete 
Mariano Bíttolo, footballer 
Ricardo Bochini, footballer 
José Luis Boffi, footballer 
Mario Bolatti, footballer 
Enrique Bologna, footballer 
Oscar Bonavena, boxer 
Iván Borghello, footballer 
Claudio Borghi, football coach 
Ángel Bossio, footballer 
Juan Botasso, footballer 
Andrés Bottiglieri, footballer 
Jonathan Bottinelli, footballer
Elmo Bovio, footballer 
Luis Brunetto, athlete 
Ezequiel Bullaude, footballer
Guillermo Burdisso, footballer 
Nicolás Burdisso, footballer 
Jeremías Caggiano, footballer 
Diego Cagna, footballer 
Lucas Calabrese, sailor 
Pablo Calandria, footballer 
Agustín Calleri, tennis player
Jonathan Calleri, footballer 
Facundo Callioni, field hockey player 
Pedro Calomino, footballer 
José María Calvo, footballer 
Adolfo Cambiaso, polo player 
Esteban Cambiasso, footballer 
Nicolás Cambiasso, footballer 
Julián Camino, footballer 
Lucas Cammareri, field hockey player 
Matías Cammareri, field hockey player 
Mauro Camoranesi, footballer.
Hugo Campagnaro, footballer 
Gustavo Campagnuolo, footballer 
Facundo Campazzo, basketball player 
Rocio Campigli, handball player 
Gonzalo Canale, rugby union player
Claudio Caniggia, footballer   
Vicente Cantatore, footballer 
Salvador Capitano, football coach 
Roberto Capparelli, footballer 
Santiago Capurro, field hockey player 
Franco Caraccio, footballer 
Ezequiel Alejo Carboni, footballer 
Martín Cardetti, footballer 
César Carignano, footballer 
Luis Alberto Carranza, footballer 
Juan Pablo Carrizo, footballer 
Federico Cartabia, footballer 
Leandro Caruso, footballer 
Damián Casalinuovo, footballer 
Raúl Alfredo Cascini, footballer 
Daniel Castellani, volleyball coach 
Iván Castellani, volleyball player
María Castelli, field hockey player 
Miguel Angel Castellini, boxer 
Eugenio Castellucci, footballer 
Yael Castiglione, volleyball player 
Martin Castrogiovanni, rugby union player 
Lucas Castromán, footballer 
Martina Cavallero, field hockey player 
Bruno Cerella, basketball player 
Alberto Cerioni, footballer 
Renato Cesarini, footballer
Roberto Cherro, footballer 
Germán Chiaraviglio, pole vaulter 
Valeria Chiaraviglio, pole vaulter 
Diego Chiodo, field hockey player 
Alberto Chividini, footballer 
Nicolas Cinalli, footballer 
Luciano Cingolani, footballer
Ezequiel Cirigliano, footballer
Renato Civelli, footballer 
Sebastián Cobelli, footballer 
Juan Martín Coggi, boxer
Roberto Colautti, footballer 
Andrea Collarini, tennis player 
Fabricio Coloccini, footballer 
María Colombo, field hockey player 
Nazareno Colombo, footballer
Juan Pablo Compagnucci, footballer 
Facundo Conte, volleyball player 
Hugo Conte, volleyball coach
Felipe Contepomi, rugby union player 
Raúl Conti, footballer 
Enzo Copetti, footballer
Julio Cozzi, footballer 
Victoria Crivelli, handball player 
Tomás Cubelli, rugby union player 
Patricio Cucchi, footballer
José Luis Cuciuffo, footballer 
Matías Claudio Cuffa, footballer 
Juan Cuminetti, volleyball player
Julio Curatella, rower
Silvina D'Elía, field hockey player
Roberto De Vicenzo, golf
Carlos Delfino, basketball player
Martín Demichelis, footballer
José Devecchi, footballer
Marco Di Cesare, footballer
Ángel Di María, footballer
Alfredo Di Stéfano, footballer
Paulo Dybala, footballer
Juan Manuel Fangio, car racer
Brian Farioli, footballer
Franco Ferrari, footballer
Gianluca Ferrari, footballer
Héctor Fértoli, footballer
Luis Ángel Firpo, boxer
Fernando Forestieri, footballer
Ignacio Gariglio, footballer
Federico Gattoni, footballer
Francisco Gerometta, footballer
Lautaro Gianetti, footballer
Manu Ginóbili, basketball player
Federico Girotti, footballer
Gonzalo Goñi, footballer
Gabriel Graciani, footballer
Mauro Icardi, footballer
Nicolás Laprovíttola, basketball player
Hernán Lamberti, footballer
Manuel Lanzini, footballer
Carlo Lattanzio, footballer
Ricardo La Volpe, footballer
Francesco Lo Celso, footballer
Giovani Lo Celso, footballer
Marcelo Loffreda, rugby union player
Ezequiel Lavezzi, footballer
Nicolino Locche, boxer
Augusto Lotti, footballer
Cristian Lucchetti, footballer
Rosario Luchetti, field hockey player
Sofía Maccari, field hockey player
Julián Malatini, footballer
Diego Maradona, footballer
Tomás Marchiori, footballer
Alan Marinelli, footballer
Alejandro Martinuccio, footballer
Gonzalo Maroni, footballer
Gerardo Martino, footballer and manager
Javier Mascherano, footballer
Humberto Maschio, footballer
César Luis Menotti, football coach
Delfina Merino, field hockey player
Lionel Messi, footballer
Nicolás Messiniti, footballer
Gonzalo Miceli, footballer
Diego Milito, footballer
Gabriel Milito, footballer 
Federico Molinari, artistic gymnast
Fernando Monetti, footballer
Alejandro Montecchia, basketball player
Luis Monti, footballer
Antonio Napolitano, footballer
Juan Ignacio Nardoni, footballer
Andrés Nocioni, basketball player
Fabricio Oberto, basketball player
Vanina Oneto, field hockey player
Raimondo Orsi, footballer
Nicolás Orsini, footballer
Juan Ignacio Pacchini, footballer
Martin Palermo, footballer
Paula Pareto, judoka
Pedro Pasculli, footballer
Daniel Passarella, footballer
Lucas Passerini, footballer
Agustín Pastorelli, footballer
Nicolás Pasquini, footballer
Germán Pezzella, footballer
Ignacio Piatti, footballer
Santiago Pierotti, footballer
Tomás Pochettino, footballer
Pablo Prigioni, basketball player
Carla Rebecchi, field hockey player
Antonino Rocca, wrestler
Cecilia Rognoni, field hockey player
Leandro Romagnoli, footballer
Agustín Rossi, footballer
Oscar Ruggeri, footballer
Gabriela Sabatini, tennis player
Lionel Scaloni, footballer and manager
Mariela Scarone, field hockey player
Ezequiel Schelotto, footballer
Luis Scola, basketball player
Hugo Sconochini, basketball player
Diego Simeone, football coach
Omar Sívori, footballer
Guillermo Stradella, footballer
Belén Succi, field hockey player
Nicolás Tagliafico, footballer
Alberto Tarantini, footballer
Renzo Tesuri, footballer
Diego Valeri, footballer
Manuel Vicentini, footballer
Javier Zanetti, footballer
 Rodrigo De Paul, footballer
Giovanni Simeone,  footballer

Writers

Orlando Barone, writer and journalist
Hector Bianciotti, novelist
Enrique Breccia, comic artist
Susana Calandrelli, poet
María Luisa Carnelli, writer and poet
Oscar Conti, humorist 
Pascual Contursi, poet 
Roberto Cossa, playwright 
Quirino Cristiani, cartoonist
Josefina Passadori, writer
Syria Poletti, writer
Manuel Puig, writer
Ernesto Sabato, writer, painter, and physicist
Juan Jose Sebreli, sociologist, essayist, and writer

See also

Argentina–Italy relations
Demographics of Argentina
German Argentines
Immigration in Argentina
Spanish Argentines

Further reading

 Perez, Santiago. 2021. "Southern (American) Hospitality: Italians in Argentina and the US during the Age of Mass Migration." The Economic Journal.

References

External links
"Immigrants Being Transported on Horse-Drawn Wagon, Buenos Aires, Argentina" is a photograph by Frank G. Carpenter. He talks about Italian Argentines in the site caption.

 
Immigration to Argentina
 
Argentine